John Ross (October 3, 1790 – August 1, 1866) was the Principal Chief of the Cherokee Nation from 1828 to 1866; he served longer in that position than any other person. Described as the Moses of his people, Ross influenced the nation through such tumultuous events as the relocation to Indian Territory and the American Civil War.

Ross was the son of a Cherokee mother and a Scottish father. His mother and maternal grandmother were each of mixed Scots-Cherokee ancestry but brought up in Cherokee culture, which is matrilineal. His  maternal grandfather was a Scottish immigrant. At the time among the matrilineal Cherokee, children born to a Cherokee mother were considered part of her family and clan; they gained their social status from their mother. The Cherokee absorbed mixed-race descendants born to its women. As a result, young John was raised to identify as Cherokee, while also learning about colonial British society; he was bilingual and bicultural. His parents sent him for formal schooling to institutions that served other mixed-race Cherokee. (According to blood quantum policy of modern times, he would be counted as one-eighth Cherokee, but this misses how he identified and was acculturated.) 

After graduation, Ross was appointed as a US Indian agent in 1811. During the War of 1812, he served as adjutant of a Cherokee regiment under the command of Andrew Jackson. After the Red Stick War ended, what was effectively a civil war among Cherokee, Ross started a tobacco plantation in Tennessee. In 1816, he built a warehouse and trading post on the Tennessee River north of the mouth of Chattanooga Creek, and started a ferry service that carried passengers from the south side of the river (Cherokee Nation) to the north side (USA). His businesses served as the start of a community known as Ross's Landing on the Tennessee River (now Chattanooga, Tennessee). Concurrently, Ross developed a keen interest in Cherokee politics and attracted the attention of the Cherokee elders, especially Principal Chiefs Pathkiller and Charles R. Hicks. Together with Major Ridge, they became his political mentors.

Ross first went to Washington, DC, in 1816 as part of a Cherokee delegation to negotiate issues of national boundaries, land ownership, and white encroachment. As the only delegate fluent in English, Ross became the principal negotiator despite his relative youth. When he returned to the Cherokee Nation in 1817, he was elected to the National Council. He became council president in the following year. The majority of the council were men like Ross: wealthy, educated, English-speaking, and of mixed blood. Even the traditionalist full-blood Cherokee perceived that he had the skills necessary to contest the whites' demands that the Cherokee cede their land and move beyond the Mississippi River. In that position, Ross's first action was to reject an offer of $200,000 from the US Indian agent made for the Cherokee to relocate voluntarily. Thereafter Ross made more trips to Washington, even as white demands intensified. In 1824, Ross boldly petitioned Congress for redress of Cherokee grievances, which made the Cherokee the first tribe ever to do so. Along the way, Ross built political support in the US capital for the Cherokee cause.

Both Pathkiller and Charles R. Hicks died in January 1827. Hicks's brother, William, was appointed interim chief. Ross and Major Ridge shared responsibilities for the affairs of the tribe. Because William did not impress the Cherokee as a leader, they elected Ross as permanent principal chief in October 1828, a position that he held until his death.

The problem of removal split the Cherokee Nation politically. Ross, backed by the vast majority, tried repeatedly to stop white political powers from forcing the nation to move. He led a faction that became known as the National Party. Twenty others, who came to believe that further resistance would be futile, wanted to seek the best settlement they could get and formed the "Treaty Party," or "Ridge Party," led by Major Ridge. Treaty Party negotiated with the United States and signed the Treaty of New Echota on December 29, 1835, which required the Cherokee to leave by 1838. Neither Chief Ross nor the national council ever approved this treaty, but the US government regarded it as valid. Ross and tens of thousands of traditional Cherokee people objected and voted against complying with an invalid treaty, which had been supported by a few hundred mostly assimilated Cherokee.

To enforce the treaty, the US government ordered the US Army to move those who did not depart by 1838; they rounded up all the people from numerous villages and towns and accompanied them to the west. This action has since been known as the "Trail of Tears," both for the loss of their homeland and thousands of lives. Some Cherokee remained in the wilderness to evade the army, and that remnant became the ancestors of the Eastern Band of Cherokee Indians. About one fourth of the Cherokee who were forced to move died along the trail, including Ross's wife, Quatie.

Ross attempted to restore political unity after his people reached Indian Territory. Opponents of removal assassinated the leaders of the Treaty Party; Stand Watie escaped and became Ross's most implacable foe. The issue of slavery soon refueled the old divisions. The Treaty Party became known as the "Southern Party," but the National Party largely became the "Union Party." Ross initially counseled neutrality, since he believed that joining in the "white man's war" would be disastrous for the future unity of their tribe. 

After the Union forces abandoned their forts in Indian Territory, Ross reversed himself and signed a treaty with the Confederacy. He later fled to Union-held Kansas, and Stand Watie became the de facto chief. The Confederates lost the war, Watie became the last Confederate general to surrender, and Ross returned to his post as principal chief.

The US required the Five Civilized Tribes to negotiate new peace treaties after the war. Ross made another trip to Washington, DC, for this purpose, and died there on August 1, 1866.

Early life and education

Ross (also known by his Cherokee name, Guwisguwi) was born in Turkeytown (in modern day Alabama), on the Coosa River, to Mollie (née McDonald) and her husband Daniel Ross, an immigrant Scots trader. His siblings who survived to adulthood included Jane Ross Coodey (1787–1844), Elizabeth Grace Ross Ross (1789–1876), Lewis Ross (1796–1870), Andrew 'Tlo-s-ta-ma' Ross (1798–1840), Margaret Ross Hicks (1803–1862), and Maria Ross Mulkey (1806–1838).

Genealogy
Under the matrilineal kinship system of the Cherokee, Ross and his siblings were considered born to his mother's family and Bird Clan. They gained their social status from her people. In such a system, typically the mother's eldest brother had a major role in the children's lives, especially for boys. His mother and grandmother were of mixed race, but also considered part of their mother's Cherokee family and clan, and were brought up primarily in Cherokee culture. 

Ross's great-grandmother Ghigooie, a full-blood Cherokee, had married William Shorey, a Scottish interpreter. Their daughter, Anna, married John McDonald, a Scots trader.

Childhood and education
Ross spent his childhood with his parents near Lookout Mountain. Educated in English by white men in a frontier American environment, Ross spoke the Cherokee language poorly. His bi-cultural background and fluency in English enabled him to represent the Cherokee to the United States government. Many full-blood Cherokee frequented his father's trading company, so he encountered tribal members on many levels. As a child, Ross participated in tribal events, such as the Green Corn Festival.

The elder Ross insisted that John also receive a rigorous classical education. After being educated at home, Ross pursued higher studies with the Reverend Gideon Blackburn, who established two schools in southeast Tennessee for Cherokee children. Classes were in English and students were mostly of mixed race, like Ross. The young Ross finished his education at an academy in South West Point, near Kingston, Tennessee.

Anglo Mixed blood background of the Cherokee Moses
Ross's life resembled prominent Anglo-Halfbreeds in the northern United States and Canada. Scots and English fur traders in North America were typically men of social status and financial standing who married high-ranking Native American women. Both sides believed these were strategic alliances, helping both the Native Americans and the traders. They educated their children in bi-cultural and multilingual environments. The mixed-race children often married and rose to positions of stature in society, both in political and economic terms.

Family life
John Ross survived two wives and had several children. He married the widow Elizabeth "Quatie" (Brown) Henley (1791–1839) in 1812 or 1813. She was a Cherokee, born in 1791 and had one child from her marriage. Her late husband, Robert Henley, may have died during the War of 1812. Quatie Ross died in 1839 in Arkansas on the Trail of Tears as discussed below. She was survived by their children James McDonald Ross (1814–1864), William Allen Ross (1817–1891), Jane Ross Meigs-Nave (1821–1894), Silas Dean Ross (1829–1872) and George Washington Ross (1830–1870). 

John Ross remarried in 1844, to Mary Stapler (1826–1865), whom he survived by less than a year. Their surviving children were Annie Brian Ross Dobson (1845–1876) and John Ross Jr. (1847–1905).

Careers

Indian agent
At the age of twenty, having completed his education and with bilingual skills, Ross received an appointment as US Indian agent to the western Cherokee and was sent to their territory (in present-day Arkansas). During the War of 1812, he served as an adjutant in a Cherokee regiment. He fought under General Andrew Jackson at the Battle of Horseshoe Bend against the British-allied Upper Creek warriors, known as the Red Sticks. They were traditionalists, who resisted the assimilationist tendencies of the Lower Creek. The latter had lived more closely with European Americans and adopted some of their practices.

Businessman and founder of Chattanooga
Ross began a series of business ventures which made him among the wealthiest of all Cherokee. He derived the majority of his wealth from cultivating  tobacco in Tennessee; it was the major commodity crop. He held about 20 enslaved African Americans to cultivate and process this labor-intensive crop.

In 1816 he founded Ross's Landing, served by a ferry crossing. After the Cherokee were removed to Indian Territory in the 1830s, European-American settlers changed the name of Ross's Landing to Chattanooga. In addition, Ross had established a trading firm and warehouse. In total, he earned upwards of $1,000 a year ($ in today's terms). 

Under pressure from white settlers in Tennessee, many Cherokee migrated into northeast Georgia. In 1827 Ross moved to Rome, Georgia, to be closer to New Echota, the Cherokee capital. In Rome, Ross established a ferry along the headwaters of the Coosa River close to the home of Major Ridge, an older wealthy and influential Cherokee leader. By December 1836, Ross's properties were appraised at $23,665 ($ today). He was ranked as one of the five wealthiest men in the Cherokee Nation.

Political apprenticeship
Between 1811 to 1827, Ross learned how to conduct negotiations with the United States and acquire leadership skills to run a national government. After 1814, Ross's political career as a Cherokee legislator and diplomat progressed with the support of such individuals as the Principal Chief Pathkiller, Assistant Principal Chief Charles R. Hicks, and Casey Holmes, an elder statesman of the Cherokee Nation, as well as the women elders of his clan.

By 1813, as relations with the United States became more complex, older, uneducated chiefs such as Pathkiller could not effectively defend Cherokee interests.  Ross's ascent showed that Cherokee leaders recognized the importance of having formally educated, English-speaking leaders to represent them. Both Pathkiller and Hicks trained Ross, who served as their clerk and worked on all financial and political matters of the nation. They also steeped him in Cherokee tradition. In a series of letters to Ross, Hicks outlined known Cherokee traditions.

In 1816, the chief's council named Ross to his first delegation to American leaders in Washington D.C. The delegation of 1816 was directed to resolve sensitive issues, including national boundaries, land ownership, and white encroachment on Cherokee land, particularly in Georgia. Only Ross was fluent in English, making him a central figure, although Cherokee society traditionally favored older leaders.

In November 1817, the Cherokee formed the National Council. Ross was elected to the thirteen-member body, where each man served two-year terms. The National Council was created to consolidate Cherokee political authority after General Andrew Jackson made two treaties with small cliques of Cherokee representing minority factions. Membership in the National Council placed Ross among the Cherokee ruling elite. The majority of the men were wealthy, of mixed-race, and English-speaking. Most Cherokee still spoke only Cherokee.

President of the National Committee
In November 1818, just before the General Council meeting with U.S. Indian agent Joseph McMinn, who was assigned to deal with the Cherokee, Ross became president of the National Committee, a position he would hold through 1827. The Council selected Ross for that leadership position because they believed he had the diplomatic skills necessary to rebuff American requests to cede Cherokee lands. He soon refused McMinn's offer of $200,000 US, conditioned upon the Cherokee voluntarily removing to the west beyond the Mississippi.

In 1819, the Council sent Ross with a delegation to Washington, D.C. He assumed a larger leadership role. The delegation proposed to clarify the provisions of the Treaty of 1817—both to limit the ceded lands and clarify Cherokee right to the remaining lands. Secretary of War John C. Calhoun pressed Ross to cede large tracts of land in Tennessee and Georgia. Although he refused, the US government pressure continued and intensified. In October 1822, Calhoun requested that the Cherokee relinquish their land claimed by Georgia, in fulfillment of the United States' obligation under the Compact of 1802. Before responding to Calhoun's proposition, Ross first ascertained the sentiment of the Cherokee people. They were unanimously opposed to further cession of land.

In January 1824, Ross traveled to Washington to defend the Cherokee possession of their land. Calhoun offered two solutions to the Cherokee delegation: either relinquish title to their lands and remove west, or accept denationalization and become citizens of the United States. Rather than accept Calhoun's ultimatum, Ross directly petitioned Congress for the Cherokee cause on April 15, 1824. This fundamentally altered the traditional relationship between an Indian nation and the US government.

Never before had an Indian nation petitioned Congress with grievances. In Ross's correspondence, what had previously been the tone of petitions by submissive Indians was replaced by assertive defenders. Ross was able to argue subtle points about legal responsibilities as well as whites. 

Some politicians in Washington recognized the change represented by Ross's leadership. Future president John Quincy Adams wrote, "[T]here was less Indian oratory, and more of the common style of white discourse, than in the same chief's speech on their first introduction." Adams specifically noted Ross as "the writer of the delegation" and remarked that "they [had] sustained a written controversy against the Georgia delegation with greate[sic] advantage." Georgia's delegation indirectly acknowledged Ross's skill: an editorial published in The Georgia Journal charged that "the Cherokee delegation's letters were fraudulent" because "too refined to have been written or dictated by an Indian".

Principal Chief of the Cherokee Nation
In January 1827, Pathkiller, the Cherokee's principal chief and last hereditary chief, and, two weeks later, Charles R. Hicks, Ross's mentor, both died. Ross, as president of the National Committee, and Major Ridge, as speaker of the National Council, were responsible for the affairs of the tribe. In a letter dated February 23, 1827, to Colonel Hugh Montgomery, the Cherokee agent, Ross wrote that with the death of Hicks, he had assumed responsibility for all public business of The Nation. Charles Hicks's brother William served briefly as interim chief until a permanent chief could be elected. Although believing he was the natural heir to his brother's position, William Hicks had not impressed the tribe with his abilities. A majority of the people knew that during the year Ross, not Hicks, had taken care of all of the regular business of the tribe. On October 17, 1828 the Cherokee elected John Ross as principal chief.

Through the 1820s, the Cherokee Council passed a series of laws creating a bicameral national government, adopting structure from the US government. In 1822 they created the Cherokee Supreme Court, capping the creation of a three-branch government. In May 1827, Ross was elected to the twenty-four member constitutional committee. It drafted a constitution calling for a principal chief, a council of the principal chiefs, and a National Committee, which together would form the General Council of the Cherokee Nation, a constitutional republic. Although the constitution was ratified in October 1827, it did not take effect until October 1828, at which point Ross was elected principal chief. He was repeatedly reelected and held this position until his death in 1866. He was very popular, among both full-bloods, who comprised three-fourths of the population, and mixed-bloods.

The Cherokee had created a constitutional republic with delegated authority capable of formulating a clear, long-range policy to protect national rights.

Supreme Court litigation

Ross found support in Congress from individuals in the National Republican Party, such as senators Henry Clay (Kentucky), Theodore Frelinghuysen, and Daniel Webster (Massachusetts), and representatives Ambrose Spencer and David (Davy) Crockett. Despite this support, in April 1829, John H. Eaton, Secretary of War (1829–1831), informed Ross that President Jackson would support the right of Georgia to extend her laws over the Cherokee people.

On December 8, 1829, President Andrew Jackson made a speech announcing his intention to pass a bill through Congress by the following spring requiring Indian tribes living in the Southeastern states to move west of the Mississippi and cede their land claims in the East.

On December 19, 1829, the Georgia legislature, enacted a series of laws that greatly restricted the Cherokee Nation: they confiscated a large section of Cherokee occupied land, nullified Cherokee law within the confiscated area, banned further meetings of the Cherokee government in Georgia, declared contracts between Indians and whites null and void unless witnessed by two whites, disallowed Indians from testifying against a white person in court, and forbade Cherokee to dig for gold on their own lands. The laws were made effective June 1, 1830. These were calculated to force the Cherokee to move.

In May 1830, Congress endorsed Jackson's policy of removal by passing the Indian Removal Act. Jackson signed the Act on May 23. It authorized the president to set aside lands west of the Mississippi to exchange for the lands of the Indian nations in the Southeast. In the summer of 1830, Jackson urged the Cherokee, Chickasaw, Choctaw and Creek to sign individual treaties accepting removal from their homelands. The Cherokee refused to attend a meeting in Nashville that Jackson proposed. The other tribes signed off on Jackson's terms.

When Ross and the Cherokee delegation failed in their efforts to protect Cherokee lands through dealings with the executive branch and Congress, Ross took the radical step of defending Cherokee rights through the U.S. courts. In June 1830, at the urging of Senators Webster and Frelinghuysen, the Cherokee delegation selected William Wirt, US Attorney General in the Monroe and Adams administrations, to defend Cherokee rights before the U.S. Supreme Court.

Wirt argued two cases on behalf of the Cherokee: Cherokee Nation v. Georgia and Worcester v. Georgia. In Cherokee Nation v. Georgia,''' Chief Justice John Marshall acknowledged that the Cherokee were a sovereign nation, stating, 
"[T]he Cherokees as a state, as a distinct political society, separated from others, capable of managing its own affairs and governing itself, has, in the opinion of a majority of the judges, been completely successful."But he did not compel President Jackson to take action that would defend the Cherokee from Georgia's laws, because he did not find that the U.S. Supreme Court had original jurisdiction over a case in which a tribe was a party.

In 1832, the Supreme Court further defined the relation of the federal government and the Cherokee Nation. In Worcester v. Georgia, the Court found that Georgia could not extend its laws to the Cherokee Nation because that was a power of the federal government. Marshall stated that 
"the acts of Georgia are repugnant to the Constitution, laws and treaties of the United States. They interfere forcibly with the relations established between the United States and the Cherokee nation, the regulation of which, according to the settled principles of our Constitution, are committed exclusively to the government of the Union."The Cherokee were considered sovereign enough to legally resist the government of Georgia, and they were encouraged to do so.

The court maintained that the Cherokee Nation was dependent on the federal government, much like a protectorate state, but still a sovereign entity. But the dispute was made moot when federal legislation in the form of the Indian Removal Act exercised the federal government's legal power to handle the whole affair. The series of decisions embarrassed Jackson politically, as Whigs attempted to use the issue in the 1832 election. They largely supported his earlier opinion that the "Indian Question" was one that was best handled by the federal government, and not local authorities.

Meanwhile, the Cherokee Nation had encountered financial hard times. The U. S. government had stopped paying the agreed-upon $6,000 annuity for previous land cessions, Georgia had effectively cut off any income from the gold fields in Cherokee lands, and the Cherokee Nation's application for a federal government loan was rejected in February 1831. With great difficulty (and private donations), Ross was able to pay the Cherokee Nation's legal bills.

Ridge Party opposition
In a meeting in May 1832, Supreme Court Justice John McLean spoke with the Cherokee delegation to offer his views on their situation. McLean's advice was to "remove and become a Territory with a patent in fee simple to the nation for all its lands and a delegate in Congress, but reserving to itself the entire right of legislation and selection of all officers." He agreed to send Ross a letter explaining his views. Ross was furious, believing that this was a form of treachery.

McLean's advice precipitated a split within the Cherokee leadership as John Ridge and Elias Boudinot began to doubt Ross's leadership. John Ridge introduced a resolution at the national council meeting in October 1832 to send a delegation to Washington to discuss a removal treaty with President Jackson. The council rejected Ridge's proposal and instead selected Joseph Vann, John Baldridge, Richard Taylor, and John Ross to represent the Cherokee. In February 1833, Ridge wrote to Ross advocating that the delegation dispatched to Washington that month should begin removal negotiations with Jackson. Ridge and Ross did not have irreconcilable worldviews; neither believed that the Cherokee could fend off Georgian usurpation of Cherokee land. However, Ridge was furious that Ross had refused to consider Jackson's offer to pay the Cherokee $3,000,000 for all their lands in Georgia, Alabama and Tennessee.

In this environment, Ross led a delegation to Washington in March 1834 to try to negotiate alternatives to removal. Ross made several proposals; however, the Cherokee Nation may not have approved any of Ross's plans, nor was there reasonable expectation that Jackson would settle for any agreement short of removal. These offers, coupled with the lengthy cross-continental trip, indicated that Ross's strategy was to prolong negotiations on removal indefinitely. There was the possibility that the next President might be more favorably inclined.

Ross's strategy was flawed because it was susceptible to the United States' making a treaty with a minority faction. On May 29, 1834, Ross received word from John H. Eaton, that a new delegation, including Major Ridge, John Ridge, Elias Boudinot, and Ross's younger brother Andrew, collectively called the "Ridge Party" or "Treaty Party", had arrived in Washington with the goal of signing a treaty of removal. The two sides attempted reconciliation, but by October 1834 still had not come to an agreement. In January 1835 the factions were again in Washington. Pressured by the presence of the Ridge Party, Ross agreed on February 25, 1835, to exchange all Cherokee lands east of the Mississippi for land west of the Mississippi, asking for $20 million dollars. He made it contingent on the General Council's accepting the terms.

Treaty of New Echota and Trail of Tears

Secretary of War Lewis Cass believed this was yet another ploy to delay action on removal for an additional year, and threatened to sign the treaty with John Ridge. On November 7, 1835, Ross and his guest, John Howard Payne, were arrested by the Georgia guard at Ross' home in Flint Springs in Bradley County, Tennessee and taken to Spring Place, Georgia, where they were imprisoned. On December 29, 1835, the Treaty Party signed the Treaty of New Echota with the U.S. Most Cherokee thought the signatories unauthorized. However, Ross could not stop its enforcement. Under orders from President Martin Van Buren, General Winfield Scott and 7,000 Federal troops forced removal of Cherokee who did not emigrate to the Indian Territory by 1838. This forced removal came to be known as the Trail of Tears. Accepting defeat, Ross convinced General Scott to allow him to supervise much of the removal process.

Returning to his home at Head of Coosa late at night, Ross saw a man he did not recognize at his house. He told the man to feed his horse and put him away for the night. Instead, the stranger followed him to the door, identified himself as Stephen Carter and told Ross that he now owned the property and had papers to prove it. Ross then learned agents of Georgia had given Carter possession of the house earlier in the week, after evicting his family. Dispossessed by Georgia (and Carter), Ross was now homeless. The next day, Ross found that family members had given his wife Quatie refuge. Quatie died of pneumonia on February 1, 1839 on the Arkansas River near Little Rock, while aboard a steamboat owned by her husband. According to a popular legend, derived from a letter written by a former soldier named John Burnett, fifty-two years after the fact, Quatie became ill after giving her coat to a child who was crying because of the cold. There is, however, almost no evidence to support the claim.  Quatie was originally buried in the Little Rock town cemetery; her remains were later moved to Mt. Holly Cemetery.

Because selling common lands was a capital crime under Cherokee law, treaty opponents assassinated Boudinot, Major Ridge and John Ridge after the migration to Indian Territory. Stand Watie, Boudinot's brother, was also attacked but he survived. The assassins were never publicly identified nor tried in court. General Matthew Arbuckle, commander of Fort Gibson, claimed he knew their identities but never tried to arrest them. Some Cherokee, particularly those tied to the pro-treaty party, claimed that Chief John Ross knew about the assassinations beforehand. Many years later, Chief Ross's son Allen, wrote that this was not so. Allen's letter, is said to be in the possession of the Oklahoma State Historical Society. Afterward, there were years of violence between the two factions.

Given the controversy over the struggle over territory and Ross's personal wealth, a vocal minority of Cherokee and a generation of political leaders in Washington considered Ross to be dictatorial, greedy, and an "aristocratic leader [who] sought to defraud" the Cherokee Nation. Ross also had influential supporters in Washington, including Thomas L. McKenney, the Commissioner of Indian Affairs (1824–1830). He described Ross as the father of the Cherokee Nation, a Moses who "led...his people in their exodus from the land of their nativity to a new country, and from the savage state to that of civilization."

Remarriage
John Ross was introduced to the Stapler family of Brandywine Springs, Delaware by Thomas McKenney in 1841. Ross had many common interests with John Stapler, a merchant and widower. His eldest daughter, Sarah, cared for her younger siblings and befriended Ross. However, her younger sister, Mary Brian Stapler, developed a real love for Ross and initiated a romantic attachment in May 1844. As the time came for Ross to return to the Indian Territory, their mutual love ripened. They married in Philadelphia on September 2, 1844.

American Civil War
The Civil War divided the Cherokee people. At first the majority supported the Confederacy, which protected their slaveholdings. Fearing that joining the Confederacy would void the earlier Cherokee treaties with the United States, Ross tried to persuade his people to remain neutral in the conflict, but eventually most chose sides. Full-bloods tended to favor maintaining relations with the United States. This group included over two thousand members of a traditionalist and abolitionist society, the Keetoowah Society. Members of this group were called "Pins" by non-members because they wore an emblem of crossed pins on their shirts.

Ross advocated that the Cherokee Nation remain neutral. It was a losing argument. At a general assembly on August 21, 1861, Ross ended his speech by announcing that in the interests of tribal and inter-Indian unity it was time to agree on an alliance with the Confederate States of America. Many of the well-armed mixed bloods, especially the wealthy led by Stand Watie, supported the Confederacy. Traditionalists and Cherokee who opposed the institution of slavery remained loyal to the Union. However, the majority of Cherokee may not have understood the nature of the new treaty.

After Ross departed to meet with President Lincoln in Washington, traditionalist Cherokee helped maneuver the selection of Ross supporter Thomas Pegg as Acting Principal Chief. Three or four of Ross's own sons fought for the Union. However, Ross's nephew by marriage, John Drew, had organized and served as Colonel of the 1st Cherokee Mounted Rifles in the Confederate Army. Most of Drew's regiment would later twice desert rather than follow Confederate orders to kill other Indians.Hauptman, Lawrence M. "American Indians and the Civil War". American Indian Places: A Historical Guidebook, p. 378. Frances H. Kennedy, ed.(2008) Houghton Mifflin Co. New York. . Many leaders of the northern faction, still led by Ross, went to Fort Leavenworth, Kansas for the duration of the war.

By 1863, the flight of many Cherokee voters to refuge in Kansas and Texas provided the pro-Confederate Treaty Party an opportunity to elect Stand Watie as principal chief without them. Pro-Union National Council members declared the election invalid. Watie that fall raided Ross's home, Rose Cottage. The home was looted and burned. Ross lost all his belongings. Ross's daughter Jane and her husband, Andrew Nave, were living at Rose Cottage at the time. Nave was shot and killed. Only the prior intervention of Watie's wife seems to have prevented the killing of additional Ross relatives. Ross's oldest son, James, who had gone to Park Hill searching for supplies, was captured and sent to prison in the Confederacy, where he died. Ross remained in exile. However, within a week of the burning, the National Council convened and restored Ross as principal chief.

Ross took his wife Mary and the children to Philadelphia so she could see her family. Ross returned to Washington, where he had an inconclusive meeting with President Lincoln and other supporters. When he returned for Mary in 1865, he found her gravely ill with what was diagnosed as "lung congestion" (likely tuberculosis). She could not travel, so he remained with her for more than a month. Mary died of her illness on July 20, 1865. She was buried in her native Delaware. Ross returned to Indian Territory after her funeral.

After the war, the two factions of the Cherokee tried to negotiate separately with the US government Southern Treaty Commission. The commissioner of Indian Affairs, Dennis N. Cooley, was persuaded to believe allegations by Stand Watie and Elias Cornelius Boudinot that Ross was a dictator who did not truly represent the Cherokee people. Even though his health was worsening, Ross left Park Hill, where he was staying with his niece, on November 9, 1865, to meet with President Andrew Johnson. Johnson instructed Cooley to reopen negotiations with the Cherokee and to meet only with the pro-Union faction, headed by John Ross. Ross died on August 1, 1866 in Washington, D.C. while still negotiating a final treaty with the federal government. However, Ross had by then persuaded Johnson to reject a particularly harsh treaty version favored by Cooley.

Death and legacy
Initially, Ross was buried beside his second wife Mary in Wilmington and Brandywine Cemetery in Wilmington, Delaware. A few months later, the Cherokee Nation returned his remains to the Ross Cemetery at Park Hill, Indian Territory (now Cherokee County, Oklahoma) for interment.

John Ross's great-great granddaughter, Mary G. Ross (August 9, 1908 – April 29, 2008) was the first Native American female engineer. She helped propel the world into an era of space travel while becoming of one of the nation's most prominent women scientists of the space age.

Namesake and monuments
The City of Chattanooga named the Market Street Bridge in Ross's honor, and a bust of Ross stands on the north side of the Hamilton County Courthouse lawn.

The city of Rossville, Georgia, located just south of the Tennessee state line, is named for Ross. It contains his former home, the John Ross House, where he lived from 1830–1838 until the state seized his lands near the Coosa River. One of the oldest surviving homes in the Chattanooga area, it has been designated as a National Historic Landmark.

The city of Park Hill, Oklahoma hosts a John Ross museum in a former schoolhouse located west of Ross Cemetery.https://www.travelok.com/listings/view.profile/id.16106 Oklahoma Visitors Guide

National Public Radio correspondent Steve Inskeep suggested that the US $20 bill be modified to carry images of both John Ross and Andrew Jackson, "illustrating our democratic experience."

Media representation
 John Ross was portrayed by Johnny Cash in an episode of NET Playhouse titled "Trail of Tears" in 1971.
 John Ross's life and the Trail of Tears are dramatized in Episode 3 of the Ric Burns "American Experience" documentary, We Shall Remain (2009), shown and available online on PBS.

See also
 Timeline of Cherokee removal
 Indian Removal Act
 List of treaties of the Confederate States of America

Notes

References

Further reading

Primary sources
 Dale, Edwards Everett. Cherokee Cavaliers; Forty Years of Cherokee History as Told in the Correspondences of the Ridge-Watie-Boudinot Family. Norman, University of Oklahoma Press, 1939.
 McKenny, Thomas Loraine. The Indian Tribes of North America with Biographical Sketches and Anecdotes of the Principal Chief. Totowa, New Jersey: Rowman and Littlefield, 1972.
 Ross, John. The Papers of Chief John Ross. Norman: University of Oklahoma Press, 1985.

Secondary Sources
 Gearing, Fred O. Priests and Warriors: Social Structures for Cherokee Politics in the Eighteenth Century. Menasha, Wisconsin, 1962.
 Hicks, Brian. Toward the Setting Sun: John Ross, the Cherokees, and the Trail of Tears. New York: Atlantic Monthly Press, 2011. 
 Inskeep, Steve. Jacksonland: President Andrew Jackson, Cherokee Chief John Ross, and a Great American Land Grab. Penguin Press, 2015. 
 Langguth, A. J. Driven West: Andrew Jackson and the Trail of Tears to the Civil War. New York, Simon & Schuster. 2010. .
 McLoughlin, William G. Cherokees and Missionaries, 1789–1839. New Haven: Yale University Press, 1984.
 Moulton, Gary E. John Ross Cherokee Chief. Athens: The University of Georgia Press, 1978.
 Prucha, Francis Paul. The Great Father: The United States Government and the American Indians I. Lincoln: University of Nebraska Press, 1984.
 Smith, Daniel Blake. An American Betrayal: Cherokee Patriots and the Trail of Tears. 2011. Henry Holt and Company. New York. .
 Williams, David. The Georgia Gold Rush: Twenty-Niners, Cherokees, and Gold Fever. Columbia: University of South Carolina Press, 1993.
 Woodward, Grace Steele. The Cherokees. University of Oklahoma Press. 1963. .

External links

 Ancestry.com John Ross Biography
 The Trail of Tears and the Forced Relocation of the Cherokee Nation a National Park Service Teaching with Historic Places (TwHP) lesson plan
 Walker County GA Attractions, Walker County, GA Chamber of Commerce
 Ross, John''; "Appletons' Cyclopædia of American Biography;" 1900.

1790 births
1866 deaths
American people of Scottish descent
Burials at Wilmington and Brandywine Cemetery
Cherokee slave owners
Native Americans in the American Civil War
People from Cherokee County, Alabama
People from Rome, Georgia
People from Rossville, Georgia
People of Indian Territory
Pre-statehood history of Oklahoma
Principal Chiefs of the Cherokee Nation (1794–1907)